The 16341 / 42 Guruvayur - Thiruvananthapuram Central Intercity Express is an Express/Mail express train belonging to Indian Railways Southern Railway zone that runs between  and  via   in India.

Coaches
The 16341 / 42 Guruvayur - Thiruvananthapuram Central Intercity Express has 1 AC Chair Car,  7 Second Sitting, 6 General Unreserved & Two SLR (seating with luggage rake) coaches . It does not carry a pantry car coach.

As is customary with most train services in India, coach composition may be amended at the discretion of Indian Railways depending on demand.

Service

Routing

Halts
Thiruvananthapuram Pettah(for 16341 only) → Varkala Sivagiri → Paravur → Mayyanad → Kollam Junction → Munroturuttu → Karunagappalli → Kayamkulam Junction → Haripad → Ambalappuzha→ Alappuzha → Mararikulam → Cherthala → Turavur → Ernakulam Junction → Aluva → Angamaly → Chalakudy → Irinjalakuda → Thrissur→ Punkunnam

Traction
As the route is going to electrification, an Erode based WDM-3D diesel locomotive pulls the train to its destination.

References

External links
16341 Intercity Express at India Rail Info
16342 Intercity Express at India Rail Info

Intercity Express (Indian Railways) trains
Transport in Guruvayur
Rail transport in Kerala
Transport in Thiruvananthapuram